Confinity Inc. was an American software company based in Silicon Valley, best known as the creator of PayPal. It was founded in December 1998 by Max Levchin, Peter Thiel, and Luke Nosek, initially as a Palm Pilot payments and cryptography company.

Company
Many of Confinity's initial recruits were alumni of The Stanford Review, also co-founded by Thiel, and most early engineers hailed from the University of Illinois at Urbana-Champaign, recruited by Levchin. Early investors included Nokia Ventures, Deutsche Bank, and William N. Melton, the founder of CyberCash.

Confinity's second office, 165 University Avenue in Palo Alto, California, is also known for being the former office of Google and Logitech. 

Confinity launched its milestone product, PayPal, in late 1999. Confinity merged with X.com, founded by Elon Musk, in March 2000. The merged company became known as X.com because this was thought to be a name with broader long-term potential than Confinity or PayPal. However, surveys showed that a majority of consumers considered the name X.com vague and potentially pornographic and preferred that the company simply be called PayPal. After a corporate restructuring, which involved the removal of Elon Musk from the company, the company adopted the name PayPal Inc.

PayPal made an Initial Public Offering on the NASDAQ stock exchange on February 14, 2002. The company was purchased by eBay in a $1.3 billion stock deal announced on July 8, 2002. eBay and PayPal became separate companies in 2015.

See also
 The PayPal Wars

References 

Financial services companies established in 1998
PayPal
Companies based in Champaign County, Illinois
Financial services companies disestablished in 2000
2000 mergers and acquisitions